This is a list of statistics in law enforcement in British Columbia in 2005, including crime rates, police strength, and police costs. In total there were 508,271 reported (non-traffic) incidents of Criminal Code offences, giving the province a crime rate of 120 offences per 1,000 people, the second highest in Canada. This was down 5% from 2004's rate of 125, and was the first decrease since 1999-2000. Of these crimes, only 22% were solved in the same year, including 52% of all violent crimes and 13% of all property crimes. This resulted in 57,817 persons being recommended for charges to the Crown counsel, of which 81% were male and 10% were young offenders (between 12 and 17 years old).

Law enforcement was supplied mainly by municipal forces, either an independent police department or the Royal Canadian Mounted Police (RCMP). Municipalities with populations over 5,000 people using the RCMP paid either 90% or 70% of their costs, depending on their population size, with the federal government paying the remainder. Those municipalities under 5,000 people shared a detachment with the general rural area but did not pay any of the policing costs while the unincorporated rural areas paid a small, varied, amount through a general rural property tax. Other police forces operating within BC include 2 First Nations forces, a RCMP federal force, the Greater Vancouver Transportation Authority Police Service (now South Coast British Columbia Transportation Authority Police Service), the Organized Crime Agency (Combined Forces Special Enforcement Unit), Conservation Officer Service, the Canadian National and Canadian Pacific railway police forces, and various municipal bylaw enforcement officers.

In the following tables crime rates refer to the number of incidents of Criminal Code offences, excluding traffic offences, per 1,000 people. If an incident involved more than one offense, only the most serious was recorded in these statistics. The population figures were based on the Canada 2001 Census and estimated for 2005. These populations only include permanent residents, so municipalities with high numbers of visitors (from the rural areas, commuters, tourists, seasonal workers, etc.) are not counted and will result in a higher crime rate. The total costs are the actual costs of police services at year end, not the budgeted costs. The case burden reflects the workload of each office: the number of offences, excluding traffic offenes, per officer.

Municipal detachments
The 11 municipalities that operated their own police department paid 100% of the total costs. Their number of officers, policies and priorities were set by a municipally-appointed police board. The 59 municipalities which contracted their police duties to the RCMP "E" Division had their officers operate under provincial or federal policies and priorities. Of the municipalities which have population over 15,000 people paid 90% and municipalities between 5,000 and 15,000 people paid 70% with the federal government paying the rest.

Provincial detachments
The RCMP provincial force covers the 86 municipalities with populations below 5,000 people and the unincorporated rural areas surrounding all municipalities. These 112 detachments and 756 officers covered 720,443 people in a province of over 4.2 million people. The costs of policing were shared between the provincial government (70%) and the federal government (30%). These municipalities did not make any direct contribution but the rural areas had some of their property tax covering a small portion of the provincial share. In some cases the municipal forces and provincial forces operated from the same detachment and reported to the same commanding officer but their statistics were kept separate. 

Policing in First Nation communities was done under one of three programs with the costs being shared between the provincial (46-48%) and federal (52-54%) governments. Under the First Nations Community Policing Services (FNCPS) 48 officers served the aboriginal communities throughout the province. Where no FNCPS agreement was made between the band and the provincial and federal governments the Aboriginal Community Constable Program had 36 First Nations officers serving the communities. There were two independent First Nations Administered Police Services (FNAPS), autonomous of the RCMP: the Kitasoo-Xaixais Public Safety Department and the Stl’atl’imx Tribal Police Service, with the Ditidaht First Nation Public Safety and Policing Services closing in 2004 (covered by the Lake Cowichan RCMP detachment in 2005).

Notes

 This RCMP detachment operated from the municipality but provided police services to the rural areas and other communities, not the municipality it operated from. A separate municipal RCMP detachment covered the municipality and its statistics were kept separate (shown above).

References

2005 in British Columbia